Majestic: Revisited is the fifth album release, the fourth studio album, by Kari Jobe which was released on September 25, 2015, and is her third album on the Sparrow Records label. The album is a continuation of her fourth album, Majestic, which was a live recording.

Critical reception

Awarding the album three and a half stars for Jesus Freak Hideout, Christopher Smith writes, "Despite any minor glitches, if soothing atmospheric worship is your cup of tea you, will want to check out Majestic (Revisited). The lyrics all point straight to Jesus and the sonic experimentation, though new territory for the worship artist, proves to be a success." Mikayla Shriver, giving the album four and a half stars from New Release Today, describes, "Her ability to sonically lead others into the presence of God is made evident in the ethereal nature of Majestic: Revisited. This album is a success as Kari provides a glimpse into her heart full of love for God, inviting us to worship with her in awe of His majesty." Rating the album four stars at 365 Days of Inspiring Media, Joshua Andre states, "there’s no doubting the passion, enthusiasm and strong faith for Jesus that Kari has."

Track listing

Chart performance

References

2015 albums
Kari Jobe albums